Electoral district VII (Croatian: VII. izborna jedinica) is one of twelve electoral districts of Croatian Parliament.

Boundaries  
Electoral district VII consist of:

 southwestern part of Zagreb County including cities and municipalities: Jastrebarsko, Klinča Sela, Krašić, Pisarovina, Samobor, Stupnik, Sveta Nedelja, Žumberak;
 whole Karlovac County;
 eastern part of Primorje-Gorski Kotar County including cities and municipalities: Bakar, Brod Moravice, Čabar, Čavle, Delnice, Fužine, Jelenje, Kastav, Klana, Lokve, Mrkopalj, Novi Vinodolski, Ravna Gora, Skrad, Vinodolska općina, Viškovo, Vrbovsko;
 western, southwestern and southern part of City of Zagreb including city districts and streets: Gajnice, Stenjevec, Malešnica, Špansko, Prečko, Vrbani, Jarun, Gajevo, Trnsko-Krešimir Rakić, Kajzerica, Savski Gaj, Remetinec, Blato, Jakuševac, Hrelić, Sveta Klara, Botinec, Brebernica, Brezovica, Buzin, Demerje, Desprim, Donji Čehi, Donji Dragonožec, Donji Trpuci, Drežnik Brezovički, Goli Breg, Gornji Čehi, Gornji Dragonožec, Gornji Trpuci, Grančari, Havidić Selo, Horvati, Hrašće Turopoljsko, Hrvatski Leskovac, Hudi Bitek, Ježdovec, Kupinečki Kraljevec, Lipnica, Lučko, Mala Mlaka, Odra, Odranski Obrež, Starjak, Strmec, Veliko Polje, Zadvorsko.

Election

2000 Elections 
 

SDP - HSLS
 Željka Antunović
 Ivo Škrabalo
 Mato Crkvenac
 Milanka Opačić
 Zrinjka Glovacki-Bernardi
 Zdenko Franić
 Ivan Štajduhar

HDZ
 Vlatko Pavletić
 Pavao Miljavac
 Ivan Penić
 Dario Vukić

HSS - LS - HNS - ASH
 Radimir Čačić
 Božidar Pankretić

HSP - HKDU
 Tonči Tadić

2003 Elections 
 

HDZ
 Miomir Žužul
 Branko Vukelić
 Branimir Pasecky
 Kolinda Grabar-Kitarović
 Ivan Vučić
 Neven Jurica
 Krunoslav Markovinović

SDP
 Mato Crkvenac
 Milanka Opačić
 Vesna Škulić
 Nenad Stazić

HSP
 Miroslav Rožić

HNS - PGS
 Darko Šantić

HSS
 Božidar Pankretić

2007 Elections 
 

SDP
 Milanka Opačić
 Josip Leko
 Nenad Stazić
 Ivo Jelušić
 Biserka Vranić
 Zdenko Franić

HDZ
 Marina Matulović-Dropulić
 Branko Vukelić
 Mario Zubović
 Ivan Vučić
 Anton Mance
 Krunoslav Markovinović

HSS - HSLS - PGS
 Božidar Pankretić

HNS
 Miljenko Dorić

2011 Elections 
 

SDP - HNS - IDS - HSU
 Milanka Opačić
 Josip Leko
 Slavko Linić
 Nenad Stazić
 Mirando Mrsić
 Mihael Zmajlović
 Luka Denona
 Ivo Jelušić
 Damir Mateljan

HDZ
 Martina Dalić
 Davor Ivo Stier
 Branko Vukelić
 Andrej Plenković

HL SR
 Nikola Vuljanić

2015 Elections 
 

SDP - HNS - HSU - HL SR - A-HSS - ZS
 Milanka Opačić
 Nenad Stazić
 Mihael Zmajlović
 Nada Turina-Đurić
 Tomislav Saucha
 Damir Mateljan

HDZ - HSS - HSP AS - BUZ - HSLS - HRAST - HDS - ZDS
 Damir Jelić
 Domagoj Ivan Milošević
 Željko Dilber
 Jasen Mesić
 Željko Fiolić

Most
 Slaven Dobrović
 Josip Katalinić

ŽZ
 Ivan Sinčić

2016 Elections 
 

SDP - HNS - HSS - HSU
 Milanka Opačić
 Krešo Beljak
 Mihael Zmajlović
 Tomislav Saucha
 Damir Mateljan
 Saša Đujić

HDZ
 Davor Ivo Stier
 Tomo Medved
 Damir Jelić
 Tomislav Ćorić
 Tomislav Klarić
 Domagoj Ivan Milošević

Most
 Josip Katalinić

ŽZ - PH - AM - Abeceda
 Ivan Vilibor Sinčić

2020 Elections 
 

HDZ
 Tomo Medved
 Tomislav Ćorić
 Nada Murganić
 Davor Ivo Stier
 Tomislav Klarić
 Josip Salapić

SDP - HNS - HSS - HSU
 Zlatko Komadina
 Krešo Beljak
 Sanja Udović
 Zvane Brumnić

Možemo - NL - RF - ORAH - ZJN - ZG
 Rada Borić

DP - HS - BLOK - HKS - HRAST - SU - ZL
 Ante Prkačin

Most
 Zvonimir Troskot

SIP - Pametno - Fokus
 Dario Zurovec

References 

Electoral districts in Croatia